Famechon is a commune in the Pas-de-Calais department in the Hauts-de-France region of France.

Geography

Population

Places of interest
 The church of Notre-Dame, dating from the seventeenth century. It has one aisle and a bell tower, and was built in the 19th century. At the start of the 17th century, an old church was at the height of the village, in line with where the cemetery is now. Inspired by the Albums de Croÿ, it featured a bell tower with two bells, a nave with three rows and a choir narrowly covered with tiles. 
 The remnants of an old chateau.

Notable people
Émile Famechon, boxer.

See also
 Communes of the Pas-de-Calais department

References

Communes of Pas-de-Calais